Zhang Qiang (born 4 May 1979) was part of the Chinese team that won gold in Wheelchair curling at the 2018 Winter Paralympics. He also competed at the 2014 Winter Paralympics.

References

External links 

Profile - 2014 Paralympic Winter Games (web archive)

1979 births
Living people
Chinese amputees
Chinese male curlers
Chinese wheelchair curlers
Paralympic wheelchair curlers of China
Paralympic medalists in wheelchair curling
Paralympic gold medalists for China
Wheelchair curlers at the 2014 Winter Paralympics
Wheelchair curlers at the 2018 Winter Paralympics
Medalists at the 2018 Winter Paralympics
World wheelchair curling champions
21st-century Chinese people